Michel-Ange Balikwisha (born 10 May 2001) is a Belgian professional footballer who plays as a forward for Royal Antwerp.

Club career 
Balikwisha made his professional debut for Standard Liège on 20 September 2020 in a Belgian First Division A game against KV Kortrijk.

International career
Born in Belgium, Balikwisha is of Congolese descent. He is a youth international for Belgium.

Career statistics

Club

Personal life
Balikwisha is the brother of the footballer William Balikwisha.

References

External links

2001 births
Living people
Belgian footballers
Belgium under-21 international footballers
Belgium youth international footballers
Association football forwards
Standard Liège players
Royal Antwerp F.C. players
Belgian Pro League players
Footballers from Ghent